Pyrgiscilla is a genus of sea snails, marine gastropod mollusks in the family Pyramidellidae, the pyrams and their allies.

This genus is now included in the genus Pyrgiscus Philippi, 1841

Species
Species within the genus Pyrgiscilla include:
 Pyrgiscilla otakauica Laws, 1937 : synonym of Pyrgiscus otakauicus (Laws, 1937)
 Pyrgiscilla taiaroa (Laws, 1937): synonym of Pyrgiscus taiaroa (Laws, 1937)

References

 Robba E. (2013) Tertiary and Quaternary fossil pyramidelloidean gastropods of Indonesia. Scripta Geologica 144: 1-191

External links
 To World Register of Marine Species
  Laws C.R. 1937. Review of the Tertiary and Recent Neozelanic Pyramidellid Molluscs. No. 3 — Further Turbonillid Genera. Transactions and Proceedings of the Royal Society of New Zealand, 67: 166-184, pl. 34-35
 Spencer H.G., Willan R.C., Marshall B.A. & Murray T.J. (2011). Checklist of the Recent Mollusca Recorded from the New Zealand Exclusive Economic Zone

Pyramidellidae